Chyże  is a village in the administrative district of Gmina Krosno Odrzańskie, within Krosno Odrzańskie County, Lubusz Voivodeship, in western Poland.

The village has an approximate population of 170.

References

Villages in Krosno Odrzańskie County